The 1990 Havering Council election took place on 3 May 1990 to elect members of Havering London Borough Council in London, England. The whole council was up for election and the council stayed in no overall control.

Background

Election result

Ward results

References

1990
1990 London Borough council elections